Zwaring-Pöls was a municipality in Austria which merged in January 2015 into Dobl-Zwaring in the Graz-Umgebung District of Styria, Austria.

Population

References

Cities and towns in Graz-Umgebung District